Jack Elder (born August 9, 1941) is an American luger. He competed in the men's doubles event at the 1972 Winter Olympics.

References

1941 births
Living people
American male lugers
Olympic lugers of the United States
Lugers at the 1972 Winter Olympics
Sportspeople from Seattle